Amblycheila schwarzi, also known as the Mojave giant tiger beetle, is a flightless and nocturnal tiger beetle species found in the southern United States. A. schwarzi was first described by German entomologist Walther Horn in 1904.

References

Cicindelidae
Beetles of North America
Beetles described in 1904
Taxa named by Walther Horn